"Don't Let Me Down" is a song by German folk group Milky Chance and American singer-songwriter Jack Johnson. The song was released on 1 May 2020 and the music video premiered on Milky Chance's YouTube channel. The song reached number one on the US Adult Alternative Songs chart in July 2020.

Background 
Milky Chance have met Jack Johnson twice in 2018; when they were on tour in Switzerland, and at the Sea Her Now festival in New Jersey. The band was honoured to work with Johnson, having listened to his music since they were teenagers, and having played his music with their friends and while doing their first band projects.

Music video 
An animated music video for the song was released on 1 May 2020. The video was illustrated by Monja Gentschow & Jana Marei, and was animated by Felix von Liska.

Personnel 
Adapted from Tidal.
 Writers: Jack Johnson, Milky Chance
 Composers: Jack Johnson, Clemens Rehbein, and Philipp Dausch
 Producers: Milky Chance, Tobias Kuhn, Konstantin Kersting

Charts

Year end charts

References 

2020 singles
2020 songs
English-language German songs
Jack Johnson (musician) songs
Milky Chance songs
Songs written by Jack Johnson (musician)
Songs written by Tobias Kuhn